Elasmobranchii is a subclass of Chondrichthyes or cartilaginous fish, including sharks (superorder Selachii), rays, skates, and sawfish (superorder Batoidea). Members of this subclass are characterised by having five to seven pairs of gill clefts opening individually to the exterior, rigid dorsal fins and small placoid scales on the skin. The teeth are in several series; the upper jaw is not fused to the cranium, and the lower jaw is articulated with the upper.  The details of this jaw anatomy vary between species, and help distinguish the different elasmobranch clades. The pelvic fins in males are modified to create claspers for the transfer of sperm. There is no swim bladder; instead, these fish maintain buoyancy with large livers rich in oil.

The definition of the clade is unclear with respect to fossil chondrichthyans. It has been used by different authors as equivalent to Neoselachii (the clade including modern sharks and rays and their last common ancestor) or for all chondrichthyans more closely related to modern sharks and rays than to Holocephali (the clade containing chimaeras and their extinct relatives).

The earliest elasmobranch fossils came from the Devonian and many surviving orders date back to the Cretaceous, or even earlier. Many species became extinct during the Permian and there was a burst of adaptive radiation during the Jurassic.

Description
Elasmobranchii is one of the two subclasses of cartilaginous fish in the class Chondrichthyes, the other being Holocephali (chimaeras).

Members of the elasmobranchii subclass have no swim bladders, five to seven pairs of gill clefts opening individually to the exterior, rigid dorsal fins, and small placoid scales.  The teeth are in several series; the upper jaw is not fused to the cranium, and the lower jaw is articulated with the upper.

Extant elasmobranchs exhibit several archetypal jaw suspensions: amphistyly, orbitostyly, hyostyly, and euhyostyly. In amphistyly, the palatoquadrate has a postorbital articulation with the chondrocranium from which ligaments primarily suspend it anteriorly. The hyoid articulates with the mandibular arch posteriorly, but it appears to provide little support to the upper and lower jaws. In orbitostyly, the orbital process hinges with the orbital wall and the hyoid provides the majority of suspensory support.

In contrast, hyostyly involves an ethmoid articulation between the upper jaw and the cranium, while the hyoid most likely provides vastly more jaw support compared to the anterior ligaments. Finally, in euhyostyly, also known as true hyostyly, the mandibular cartilages lack a ligamentous connection to the cranium. Instead, the hyomandibular cartilages provide the only means of jaw support, while the ceratohyal and basihyal elements articulate with the lower jaw, but are disconnected from the rest of the hyoid. The eyes have a tapetum lucidum.  The inner margin of each pelvic fin in the male fish is grooved to constitute a clasper for the transmission of sperm.  These fish are widely distributed in tropical and temperate waters.

Many fish maintain buoyancy with swim bladders. However elasmobranchs lack swim bladders, and maintain buoyancy instead with large livers that are full of oil. This stored oil may also function as a nutrient when food is scarce. Deep sea sharks are usually targeted for their oil, because the livers of these species can weigh up to 20% of their total weight.

Evolution

Fossilised shark teeth are known from the early Devonian, around 400 million years ago. During the following Carboniferous period, the sharks underwent a period of diversification, with many new forms evolving. Many of these became extinct during the Permian, but the remaining sharks underwent a second burst of adaptive radiation during the Jurassic, around which time the skates and rays first appeared. Many surviving orders of elasmobranch date back to the Cretaceous, or earlier.

Habitats 
Elasmobranchs are mostly a marine taxon, but we know several species that live in freshwater environment (approximately 60 species which represent only 5% of the 1154 described species). They can be divided into two groups: The euryhaline elasmobranchs, which are marine species that may survive and reproduce in freshwater environments, and the obligated freshwater elasmobranchs, which only lives in freshwater environment their entire life. This group contains only one clade: the subfamily Potamotrygoninae. This clade is endemic (i.e. exclusive) to one specific region: tropical, subtropical water and wetland of South America.

Recent research in Paraná river have shown that obligated freshwater elasmobranchs were more susceptible to anthropogenic threats as overfishing and destruction of habitats due to the very small areas they live in compared to the marine species.

New research has highlighted the importance of coastal wetlands, like mangroves and seagrasses, as habitats for many species of elasmobranch.

Taxonomy
Compagno's 2005 Sharks of the World arranges the class as follows:

Subclass Elasmobranchii
†Order Phoebodontiformes
†Order Squatinactiformes
†Order Protacrodontiformes
†Infraclass Cladoselachimorpha
†Order Cladoselachiformes
†Infraclass Xenacanthimorpha
†Order Xenacanthiformes
†Order Ctenacanthiformes
Infraclass Euselachii (sharks and rays)
†Order Hybodontiformes
Division Neoselachii
†Order Synechodontiformes
Subdivision Selachii (Selachimorpha) (modern sharks)
Order Echinorhiniformes (bramble sharks)
Superorder Galeomorphii
Order Heterodontiformes (bullhead sharks)
Order Orectolobiformes (carpet sharks)
Order Lamniformes (mackerel sharks)
Order Carcharhiniformes (ground sharks)
Superorder Squalomorphii
Order Hexanchiformes (frilled and cow sharks)
Order Squaliformes (dogfish sharks)
†Order Protospinaciformes
Order Squatiniformes (angel sharks)
Order Pristiophoriformes (sawsharks)
Subdivision Batoidea (rays, skates, and sawfish)
Order Torpediniformes (electric rays)
Order Pristiformes (sawfishes)
Order Rajiformes (skates and relatives)
Order Myliobatiformes (stingrays and relatives)
Incertae sedis
Ptychodontidae

Recent molecular studies suggest the Batoidea are not derived selachians as previously thought. Instead, skates and rays are a monophyletic superorder within Elasmobranchii that shares a common ancestor with the selachians.

See also
 Cartilaginous versus bony fishes
 List of Elasmobranch cestodes, tape worms which infect sharks, rays and skates

References

External links 
 Skaphandrus.com Elasmobranchii

 
Wenlock first appearances
Vertebrate subclasses
Taxa named by Charles Lucien Bonaparte